NHL All-Star Hockey '95 is a video game developed by American studio Double Diamond and published by Sega for the Sega Genesis in 1995.

Gameplay
NHL All-Star Hockey '95 is a hockey game which features the license and stats for each hockey player.

Reception
Next Generation reviewed the game, rating it three stars out of five, and stated that "The slow pace and wonky control keep Sega's All-Star NHL '95 in the middle of the hockey pack with a host of other wannabe's, and until next year, EA's NHL '95 still holds the cup."

Preview
GameFan #25 (Vol 3, Issue 1) January 1995

Reviews
GamePro (Mar, 1995)
Electronic Gaming Monthly (Apr, 1995)
GameFan Magazine - Mar, 1995
Game Players - Mar, 1995
Sega-16.com (May 11, 2009)

References

1995 video games
National Hockey League video games
Sega video games
Sega Genesis games
Sega Genesis-only games
Video games developed in the United States